The Latter Rain is the debut album by Norwegian progressive death metal band In Vain, released on March 29, 2007, in Europe by Indie Recordings. The album was recorded at the Dub Studio, in Kristiansand, between June and October 2006, except from the Organ, recorded in Kristiansand Symfoniorkesters studio in Marvika, Kristiansand.

The album features a lot of guests, including producer Endre Kirkesola on organs, Jan Kenneth Transeth on vocals, and George Wright on spoken words. It gained a small, but positive, fan base and have currently a rating of 4.5/5 stars on allmusic.com and sputnikmusic. Some rare pressings of this record includes a bonus track "Epilogue: Alene" which was first released on their EP, "Wounds". Both bassist/vocalist Kristian Wikstøl and guitarist Even Fuglestad were credited as band members on this record, even though they were not a part of the band when the album was recorded. Kristian Wikstøl sang some hardcore vocals as a guest. This is the last and only album to feature guitarist Magnus Olav Tveiten and bassist Ole Vistnes.

Track listing
From Metal Archives.

Credits

Band members

 Johnar Håland – guitars, acoustic guitars & backing vocals
 Sindre Nedland – vocals, piano & organ
 Andreas Frigstad – lead vocals
 Stig Reinhardtsen – drums
 Magnus Olav Tveiten – guitars, acoustic guitars
 Ole Vistnes – bass guitars

Guest musicians
 Endre Kirkesola – B3 Hammond organ, church organ, arrangements
 Jan Kenneth Transeth – vocals, backing vocals (on track 2,4)
 Kjetil Nordhus – vocals, backing vocals (on track 2,3,4,5)
 Kristian Wikstøl – hardcore vocals, backing vocals (on track 2,3,6)
 George Wright – spoken words (on track 2,5)
 Håvard Kittelsen – trombone
 Andres Hofstad Søraas – lap steel
 Glenn Vorhaug – saxophone
 Henning Seldal – orchestral percussion
 Tore Bråthen – trumpet
 Sarah Høigildt – cello
 Ida Marie Sørmo – flute
 Cecilia Wilder – viola
 Hannah Wilder – violin

Production

 Endre Kirkesola – producer, engineering, mixing, samples
 Johnar Håland – producer, engineering, mixing, samples
 Peter in de Betou – Mastering
 Andreas Frigstad – art direction
 Øyvind Råmunddal – cover art, art direction
 Tor Erik Schrøder – photography

References

In Vain (band) albums
2007 debut albums